Kim Bác Sơn is a small gilded metal ornament to decorate courtier's cap in the Nguyễn dynasty. It is thought to first appear in the late Lê dynasty.

images

Vietnamese culture
Vietnamese headgear